Senecio glabratus is a species of the genus Senecio and family Asteraceae.

References

External links

glabratus
Flora of Chile